Jamie Drysdale (born April 8, 2002) is a Canadian professional ice hockey defenceman for the Anaheim Ducks of the National Hockey League (NHL). He was selected sixth overall by the Anaheim Ducks in the 2020 NHL Entry Draft.

Early life
Drysdale was born on April 8, 2002, in Toronto, Ontario, to parents Gary and Tina. He learned to skate through the hockey program Learn to Play at the age of five. Growing up, his father's favorite player was Bobby Orr of the Boston Bruins, resulting in both his sons wearing the jersey number four. He has often said that his older brother, Charlie Drysdale, was his muse throughout his youth.

Playing career
Growing up in Toronto, Drysdale competed in the Ontario Junior Hockey League with the St. Michael's Buzzers and played Minor Midget AAA hockey with the Toronto Marlboros of the Greater Toronto Hockey League (GTHL). At the age of 15, he helped lead the Marlboros to a GTHL Championship and was named the GTHL’s Player of the Year. He also helped GTHL Red win the 2018 OHL Gold Cup Final and was named to the OHL Cup All-Star Team. As a result of his play, Drysdale was drafted fourth overall by the Erie Otters in the 2018 Ontario Hockey League (OHL) Priority Selection. 

During his rookie season with the Otters, Drysdale led team defensemen in goals, assists, scoring, and power-play points resulting in a selection for the 2018-19 OHL First All-Rookie Team. The following season, he ranked 10th among OHL defensemen in points-per-game by recording nine goals and 38 points in 49 games. As a result, he was named an OHL First Team All-Star in 2019–20.

Professional

While the league was paused due to the COVID-19 pandemic, Drysdale took up rollerblading to remain in shape and began working out at home. Leading up to the 2020 NHL Entry Draft, Drysdale received praise from scout David Gregory who said: "Drysdale is the kind of player that every team is looking for, very smart puck-moving defenseman who can beat you with his vision, beat you with his hockey sense, able to use that great quickness and thinking..." He earned a high final ranking from the NHL Central Scouting Bureau amongst North American skaters before being drafted sixth overall by the Anaheim Ducks. 

Shortly following the draft, Drysdale signed a three-year, entry-level contract with Anaheim. Drysdale made his NHL debut on March 18, 2021 against the Arizona Coyotes, where he also recorded his first career NHL goal. During the same game, fellow rookie Trevor Zegras also scored, making the teammates the youngest in NHL history to each score their first NHL goals less than 2:30 apart.

International play

 

Jamie Drysdale has represented Team Canada at the international level on numerous occasions. His first international tournament was during the 2018 World U-17 Hockey Challenge with Canada Black. He recorded four points in five games as the team failed to medal. Following the tournament, Drysdale competed at the 2019 IIHF World U18 Championships and 2019 Hlinka Gretzky Cup.

In 2020, Drysdale became the seventh 17-year-old defenceman to play for Team Canada at the World Juniors since 1991. He originally served as Team Canada's extra defenceman before making his debut during the semifinal game against Finland as a replacement for an ill Bowen Byram. Throughout the tournament, he averaged 11:38 of ice time and recorded one goal and two assists in seven games. Drysdale was again named to Team Canada at the 2021 World Junior Ice Hockey Championships where he was a top-pairing defenceman alongside Byram.

Career statistics

Regular season and playoffs

International

References

External links
 

2002 births
Living people
Anaheim Ducks draft picks
Anaheim Ducks players
Canadian ice hockey defencemen
Erie Otters players
National Hockey League first-round draft picks
San Diego Gulls (AHL) players
Ice hockey people from Toronto